Istanbul Congress Center (ICC) is a convention center located at Harbiye neighborhood of Şişli district in Istanbul, Turkey. Opened on October 17, 2009, it is owned by Istanbul Metropolitan Municipality.

Situated adjacent to Harbiye Muhsin Ertuğrul Stage, it is a multi-level complex, which was built to host the 2009 IMF and World Bank Group Annual Meeting. The building has a foyer at ground level, several meeting halls in different sizes in five underground levels and car park in the lowest two levels.

Facilities
At the first basement level B1, there are seven meeting halls of a total area  and total seating capacity of 488 people. Its entrance is situated at level B2. Four of these halls are divisible in two or three smaller spaces by soundproof panels.

The levels B6 and B7 are designed as car park capable of 850 vehicles in total. The center is connected with a passage to Istanbul Lütfi Kırdar Convention and Exhibition Center across the street, which is closed to traffic.

Notable events
 2009 IMF and World Bank Group Annual Meeting
 2013 Turkey Innovation Week
 2014 7th World Congress on Pediatric Intensive and Critical Care
 2015 ABU TV Song Festival
 2015 ACI AIRPORT EXCHANGE, hosted by İGA Havalimanı İşletmesi A.Ş

See also
 Istanbul Lütfi Kırdar Convention and Exhibition Center

References

External links 

 

Convention centers in Turkey
Buildings and structures in Istanbul
2009 establishments in Turkey
Buildings and structures completed in 2009
Şişli
21st-century architecture in Turkey